Trevor is a male given name and surname.

Trevor may also refer to:

Places

United States 
Trevor, Wisconsin

Wales, UK 
Trevor, Wrexham
Trevor Basin, a canal basin
Trevor railway station
Trefor, Gwynedd
Trefor, Anglesey

People
Baron Trevor, three titles, two of them extinct 
Glen Trevor (1900–1954), pen-name of James Hilton

Other meanings
Trevor (film), 1994 award-winning short film 
"Trevor" (The X-Files), an episode of the television series The X-Files
The Trevor Project, toll-free suicide prevention helpline aimed at gay and questioning youth in the United States, inspired by the film
Trevor disease, a bone development disorder

See also

Trefor (disambiguation)
Trevorrow
Trev